Herbie is a fictional sentient anthropomorphic 1963 Volkswagen Beetle.

Herbie may also refer to:

 Herbie (film), a 1966 short film by George Lucas
 Herbie (franchise), the film series from which the Beetle originated.
 Herbie (given name), a list of people and fictional characters with the given name or nickname
 Herbie (tree), an elm tree located in Yarmouth, Maine
 H.E.R.B.I.E., a fictional robot created by Mr. Fantastic of the Fantastic Four
 Herbie Popnecker, title character of Herbie comic

See also 
Herbert (disambiguation)
Herb (disambiguation)